Lorimer may refer to:

Surname
Lorimer (surname)

Middle name
James Lorimer Ilsley (1894–1967), Canadian politician and jurist
John Lorimer Worden (1818–1897), U.S. Admiral who served in the American Civil War

Other uses
Lorimer Park, a public park in Abington Township, Pennsylvania, United States
New York City Subway stations in Brooklyn, New York City, New York, United States:
Lorimer Street (BMT Canarsie Line), serving the  train
Lorimer Street (BMT Jamaica Line), serving the  trains 
Lorimer's method, a technique for evaluating slope stability in cohesive soils
Lorimer burst, a fast radio burst

See also
 Lorimar Television, an American television production company
 Lorimier (disambiguation)
 Larimer (disambiguation)